St. Maries (pronounced like "St. Mary's") is a city in north central Idaho, the largest in rural Benewah County and its county seat. Its population was 2,402 at the 2010 census, down from 2,652 in 2000.

History

The townsite was selected by Joseph Fisher, just southwest of the confluence of St. Maries River and St. Joe River, to provide a location for a sawmill, first built in 1889. The rivers and lake systems provided rapid transportation systems for floating logs to the mills and utilizing steamboats to transport finished products to market. From the city, the St. Joe River flows west, through several lakes and into the south end of Lake Coeur d'Alene.

The Pacific Extension of the Chicago, Milwaukee, St. Paul and Pacific Railroad (Milwaukee Road) arrived in 1908. The city was established in 1913 when Benewah County was formed from southern Kootenai County. In 1915 St. Maries was named its county seat.

Geography
The St. Maries River to the east and the St. Joe River to the north frame the city.

Climate
According to the Köppen climate classification system, St. Maries has a warm-summer Mediterranean climate (Köppen Csb).

Demographics

2010 census
As of the census of 2010, there were 2,402 people, 999 households, and 641 families living in the city. The racial makeup of the city was 96.0% White, 0.3% African American, 1.1% Native American, 0.6% Asian, 0.1% Pacific Islander, 0.2% from other races, and 1.8% from two or more races. Hispanic or Latino of any race were 1.6% of the population.

There were 999 households, of which 32.1% had children under the age of 18 living with them, 47.4% were married couples living together, 12.2% had a female householder with no husband present, 4.5% had a male householder with no wife present, and 35.8% were non-families. 31.0% of all households were made up of individuals, and 15.8% had someone living alone who was 65 years of age or older. The average household size was 2.34 and the average family size was 2.88.

The median age in the city was 40.9 years. 24.5% of residents were under the age of 18; 7.8% were between the ages of 18 and 24; 22.7% were from 25 to 44; 25.4% were from 45 to 64; and 19.6% were 65 years of age or older. The gender makeup of the city was 49.4% male and 50.6% female.

2000 census
As of the census of 2000, there were 2,652 people, 1,061 households, and 675 families living in the city. The racial makeup of the city was 95.93% White, 1.73% Native American, 0.11% Asian, 0.19% from other races, and 2.04% from two or more races. Hispanic or Latino of any race were 1.66% of the population.

There were 1,061 households, out of which 33.3% had children under the age of 18 living with them, 50.7% were married couples living together, 9.2% had a female householder with no husband present, and 36.3% were non-families. 29.9% of all households were made up of individuals, and 15.4% had someone living alone who was 65 years of age or older.  The average household size was 2.38 and the average family size was 2.98.

In the city, the population was spread out, with 26.4% under the age of 18, 7.6% from 18 to 24, 25.7% from 25 to 44, 23.3% from 45 to 64, and 17.0% who were 65 years of age or older.  The median age was 38 years. For every 100 females, there were 102.6 males.  For every 100 females age 18 and over, there were 95.1 males.

The median income for a household in the city was $32,054, and the median income for a family was $37,474. Males had a median income of $35,625 versus $19,509 for females. The per capita income for the city was $16,745.  About 10.7% of families and 12.8% of the population were below the poverty line, including 16.5% of those under age 18 and 14.9% of those age 65 or over.

Government
The city council of St. Maries consists of six council members. There is also a planning & zoning commission that consists of four members and a chairman. As of January 2020, the current mayor of St. Maries is Tom Carver.

Education

The public schools are operated by St. Maries Joint School District #41.

The high school's mascot is a lumberjack and the school colors are forest green and old gold; the same are used for the middle and elementary school. The lumberjack statue at the elementary school on Main Street was originally a Texaco "Big Friend," a Muffler Man from the mid-1960s.

Notable people
Tom Mueller, rocket engineer and founding employee of SpaceX
 C. A. Robins, physician and 22nd Governor of Idaho (1947–1951)
 Pappy Boyington, USMC, World War II fighter ace, Medal of Honor recipient; resident until age 12
Vernon Baker, first living black Medal of Honor recipient
Georgia Coleman, diver, won four medals at 1928 and 1932 Summer Olympics, born in St. Maries
Jeff Choate, college football head coach at Montana State University

References

External links
 The Greater St. Joe Development Foundation's webpage for St. Maries
 St. Maries Chamber of Commerce

Saint Maries, Idaho
Saint Maries, Idaho
County seats in Idaho
1913 establishments in Idaho
Populated places established in 1913